This was the first edition of the tournament.

Maryna Zanevska defeated Viktorija Golubic in the final 7–6(8–6), 6–1, winning her first singles title at Challenger level.

Seeds

Draw

Finals

Top half

Bottom half

Qualifying

Seeds

Qualifiers

Lucky losers

Draw

First qualifier

Second qualifier

Third qualifier

Fourth qualifier

References

Main draw
Qualifying draw

External links
 WTA website of the tournament

Open de Rouen – Women's singles